Dhanteras, also known as Dhanatrayodashi, is the first day that marks the festival of Diwali in most of India.

It is celebrated on the thirteenth lunar day (Trayodashi) of Krishna Paksha (dark fortnight) in the Hindu calendar month of Ashwayuja (according to the amanta tradition) or Kartika (according to the purnimanta tradition). Dhanvantari, who is also worshipped on the occasion of Dhanteras, is considered the God of Ayurveda who imparted the wisdom of Ayurveda for the betterment of mankind, and to help rid it of the suffering of disease. The Indian ministry of Ayurveda, Yoga and Naturopathy, Unani, Siddha and Homeopathy, announced its decision to observe Dhanteras, as the "National Ayurveda Day", which was first observed on 28 October 2016. Usually, Gujarati families will enjoy a meal of daal baath and malpua to ring in the new year.

Celebrations   
Vasubaras marks the beginning of the celebration of Diwali in most parts of India. On Vasubaras, the cow and her calf are worshiped. The cow holds a very sacred place in Vedic culture. Referred to as "Gau Mata" (mother cow), she is worshiped and nurtured with the utmost respect. "Gau Mata" and her Prasad "Pancha Gavya", or "Panchamrut", are frequently used in all Hindu celebrations. Vasubaras is followed by Dhanteras.

Dhanteras is the worship of lord Dhanvantari. Lord Dhanvantari, according  to Hindu traditions, emerged during Samudra Manthan, holding a Kalasha full of Amrit (an Ayurvedic herbal mix bestowing immortality) in one hand and the sacred text about Ayurveda in the other hand. He is considered to be the Vaidya of Gods.

The festival is celebrated as Lakshmi Puja which is performed in the evenings when lamps of clay (Diyas) are lit. Bhajans, devotional songs in praise of Goddess Lakshmi, are sung and Naivedhya of traditional sweets is offered to the Goddess. A peculiar custom in Maharashtra exists where people lightly pound dried coriander seeds (Dhane in Marathi, for Dhanatrayodashi) with jaggery (cane sugar) and offer the mixture as Naivedhya.

On Dhanteras, homes that have not yet been cleaned in preparation for Diwali are thoroughly cleansed and whitewashed, and Lord Dhanvantari, the god of health and Ayurveda, is worshiped in the evening. The main entrance is decorated with colorful lanterns, holiday lights and traditional motifs of Rangoli designs are made to welcome the Goddess of Wealth and Prosperity. To indicate her long-awaited arrival, small footprints are drawn with rice flour and vermilion powder all over the house. On the night of Dhanteras, diyas (lamps) are ritually kept burning all through the night in honor of Lakshmi and Dhanvantari.

Hindus consider this an extremely auspicious day for making new purchases, especially of gold or silver articles and new utensils. It is believed that new "Dhan" (wealth) or some item made of precious metal is a sign of good luck. In modern times, Dhanteras has come to be known as the most auspicious occasion for buying gold, silver, and other metals, especially kitchenware. The day also sees heavy purchases of appliances and automobiles.

On this night, the lights are set out every night both in the sky lamps and as offerings at the base of a Tulsi plant and also in the form of diyas, which are placed in front of the doorways of homes. This light is an offering to Yama, the Host of Death, to avert untimely death during the time of the Diwali festival. This day is a celebration aimed at increasing wealth and prosperity. Dhanteras engages themes of cleansing, renewal, and the securing of auspiciousness as embodied by Lakshmi.

In the villages, cattle are adorned and worshiped by farmers as their main source of income.

Within India

In South India (especially Tamil Nadu), Brahmin women make 'Marundhu' which translates as 'medicine' on the eve of Naraka Chaturdasi that is Dhanvantri Trayodashi. The Marundhu is offered during the prayer and eaten in the early morning on Naraka Chaturdasi before sunrise. In fact, many families hand over the recipes of Marundhu to their daughters and daughters-in-law. The Marundhu is consumed to eliminate the imbalance of tridoshas in the body.

Dhanteras Rangolis 
Indian people also celebrate Dhanteras by preparing rangolis.

Significance

On the day of Dhantrayodashi, Goddess Lakshmi came out from the ocean of milk during the churning of the Sea. Hence, Goddess Lakshmi is worshiped on the day of Trayodashi. However, according to the holy scriptures, this worship is all folktale, which is not mentioned anywhere in our holy books. Even Shrimad Bhagavad Gita Adhyay 16 Shloka 23 and 24 has denied it.

According to a popular legend, when the devas and asuras performed the Samudra manthan (churning of the ocean) for Amrita (the divine nectar of immortality), Dhanvantari (the physician of the Gods and an incarnation of Vishnu) emerged carrying a jar of the elixir on the day of Dhanteras.

Legends
An ancient legend ascribes the occasion to an interesting story about the 16-year-old son of King Hima. His horoscope predicted his death by snake-bite on the fourth day of his marriage. On that particular day, his newly-wed wife did not allow him to sleep. She laid out all her ornaments and many gold and silver coins in a heap at the entrance of the sleeping chamber and lit many lamps. Then she narrated stories and sang songs to keep her husband from falling asleep; the next day, when Yama, the god of Death arrived at the prince's doorstep in the guise of a serpent, his eyes were dazzled and blinded by the brilliance of the lamps and the jewellery. Yama could not enter the Prince's chamber, so he climbed on top of the heap of gold coins and sat there the entire night listening to the stories and songs. In the morning, he silently went away. Thus, the young prince was saved from the clutches of death by the cleverness of his new bride, and the day came to be celebrated as Dhanteras.

The following day came to be called Naraka Chaturdashi ('Naraka' means hell and Chaturdashi means 14th). It is also known as ‘Yamadeepdaan’ as the ladies of the house light earthen lamps or ‘deep’ and these are kept burning throughout the night glorifying Yama, the God of Death. Since this is the night before Diwali, it is also called 'Chhoti Diwali' or Minor Diwali.
In Jainism, this day is celebrated as DHANYATERAS instead of DHANTERAS meaning auspicious day of thirteenth. It is said that on this day Mahavira was in the state of leaving everything in this world and meditating before Moksha which made this day auspicious or DHANYA.

See also
 Ganesh – Hindu god

References

Hindu festivals
Diwali
Hindu holy days
Religious festivals in India
October observances
November observances